Matu, also known as Matu Chin (Matupi) or Nga La, is a Kuki-Chin-Mizo language spoken in Matupi township, Chin State, Burma, and also in Mizoram, India by the Matu people. The "Matu/Batu" dialect is the most common used dialect in Matupi(formerly known as Batupuei), and is the official language of Matupi township other than Bamar or Burmese language, which is the official language of Myanmar.

Dialects
Ethnologue lists the following dialects of Matupi, Chinstate. Matu from Mizoram, India is reportedly not intelligible with various tribal ethnicities of Matupi in Myanmar.

Matu (Batu)- Language of native citizens/settlers of Matupi(formerly known as Batupuei)
Ciing - (Langle (Tlamtlaih), Ngalaeng, Phanaeng, Voitu)
Doem (Valang) 
Nguitu (Leiring)
Hlangpang (Changpyang-Ramtuem)
Haltu
Ta'aw (Daihnan, Luivang)
Tuivang (Amsoi-Rawkthang)
Matu Dai (Madu-Weilu)
Weilaung (Kronam-Leishi)
Thaiphum

References

Shintani Tadahiko. 2016. The Matu language. Linguistic survey of Tay cultural area (LSTCA) no. 110. Tokyo: Research Institute for Languages and Cultures of Asia and Africa (ILCAA).

Kuki-Chin languages
Languages of Mizoram
Languages of Myanmar